Imbricaria pugnaxa is a species of sea snail, a marine gastropod mollusk in the family Mitridae, the miters or miter snails.

Description
The length of the shell varies between 19 mm and 40 mm.

Distribution
This marine species occurs off the Philippines.

References

 Poppe G.T., Tagaro S. & Salisbury R. (2009) New species of Mitridae and Costellariidae from the Philippines. Visaya Suppl. 4: 1–86

Mitridae
Gastropods described in 2009